Charqaoua is a small town and rural commune in Meknès-El Menzeh Prefecture of the Fès-Meknès region of Morocco. At the time of the 2004 census, the commune had a total population of 5,540 people living in 797 households.

References

Populated places in Meknès Prefecture
Rural communes of Fès-Meknès